Rummelsburg is a subdivision or neighborhood (Ortsteil) of the borough (Bezirk) of Lichtenberg of the German capital, Berlin.

History
Rummelsburg was founded in 1669. On 30 January 1889 it became a rural municipality, with the name of Boxhagen-Rummelsburg. Merged in 1912 in the town of Lichtenberg, in 1920 it was incorporated in Berlin with the Greater Berlin Act.

Geography

Overview
Located in the eastern side of the city and crossed by Spree river in the western corner, Rummelsburg borders with Lichtenberg, Friedrichsfelde, Karlshorst, Friedrichshain (in Friedrichshain-Kreuzberg district), Plänterwald and Oberschöneweide (both in Treptow-Köpenick district). The lake Rummelsburger See belongs to the locality and separates it from Stralau, a zone of Friedrichshain.

Subdivision
Rummelsburg counts 1 zone (Ortslage):
Victoriastadt

Transport
The locality is served by several urban rail lines of S-Bahn and U-Bahn. The stations serving the locality are Rummelsburg (S3 line), Betriebsbahnhof Rummelsburg (S3), Nöldnerplatz (S5, S7, S75), partly Ostkreuz (S3, S4, S5, S7, S75, S8, S85, S9) and part of the DB station of Lichtenberg (S5, S7, S75, U5, Tram).

Personalities
Adolph Schlicht (1840–1910)
Heinrich Zille (1858–1929)
Margarete Steffin (1908–1941)

Photogallery

References

External links

 Rummelsburg page on www.berlin.de

Localities of Berlin